Rachel Katznelson-Shazar, also known as Rachel Shazar, (24 October 1885 – 11 August 1975) was an active figure in the Zionist movement.  Her husband was Zalman Shazar, the third President of the State of Israel.

Biography
Rachel Katznelson (later Shazar) was born in 1885 (or possibly 1888) in the city of Babruysk, then in the Russian Empire, to a  traditional Jewish family. Katznelson's brothers were Avraham Katznelson, later a signatory of the Israeli declaration of independence, Joseph Katznelson, a follower of Ze'ev Jabotinsky who was active in clandestine immigration activities of the Irgun, and Reuben Katznelson, who joined the Jewish Legion and became Joseph Trumpeldor's sergeant. Reuben  was the father of Shulamit Katznelson and Shmuel Tamir.

She graduated from a Russian high school with honors at the age of 18. This gave her the possibility of going to university, which was only open to a small percentage of the Jewish community. She was accepted to the St. Petersburg University to study literature and history. She also studied at the Academy for Jewish Studies in St. Petersburg, where she met her future husband, Zalman Shazar - then known as Shneur Zalman Rubashov - whom she married in 1920.

Katznelson immigrated to Ottoman Palestine in 1912 and was active in a number of Zionist organizations, having previously joined the Labor Zionist movement in 1905 in her hometown.

Public and political activism
In 1916, she was elected to the first Cultural Committee of the Labor Movement, alongside Berl Katznelson and Yitzhak Tabenkin (both also originally from Babruysk), and worked with them to enhance the education of workers. She was later elected as a member of the cultural committee of the Achdut Ha'avodah party and, in 1924, of the Histadrut. Throughout her life, she was actively involved with the Histadrut and the Mapai party, and performed many public duties.  She also assisted her husband in his various public functions as a member of the Knesset, a government minister, a member of the Jewish Agency executive, and ultimately as President of Israel from 1963 to 1973.

Awards and recognition
 In 1946, Katznelson-Shazar was awarded the Brenner Prize.
 In 1958, she was awarded the Israel Prize, in social sciences.
 In 1968, she received the Yakir Yerushalayim (Worthy Citizen of Jerusalem) award.

See also
List of Israel Prize recipients
Women of Israel

References

1885 births
1975 deaths
People from Babruysk
People from Bobruysky Uyezd
Belarusian Jews
Jews from the Russian Empire
Emigrants from the Russian Empire to the Ottoman Empire
Jews in Ottoman Palestine
Jews in Mandatory Palestine
Israeli people of Belarusian-Jewish descent
Mapai politicians
Brenner Prize recipients
Israel Prize women recipients
Israel Prize in social sciences recipients
20th-century Israeli women politicians
Spouses of presidents of Israel
Saint Petersburg State University alumni
Zionists
Jewish women politicians